Rhododendron glaucophyllum is a rhododendron species native to eastern Nepal, India, Bhutan, and southern Tibet, where it grows at altitudes of . The flowers are predominantly pink.

References

 "Rhododendron glaucophyllum", J. Arnold Arbor. 26: 73 1945.

glaucophyllum